"Popstar" (stylized in all caps) is a song by American record producer DJ Khaled, featuring Canadian rapper Drake. It was released on July 17, 2020, simultaneously with their other collaboration "Greece", as the dual lead singles from Khaled's twelfth studio album, Khaled Khaled. Both songs were produced by frequent Drake collaborator OZ. It marked the sixth and seventh collaborations between Khaled and Drake, and their first since 2017's "To the Max". The mid-tempo "Popstar" sees Drake boasting about being the "popstar" of the generation. The song proved to be more successful than "Greece", debuting at number three on the Billboard Hot 100, and number-one in Drake's native Canada.

Background
In January 2020, Khaled flew to Drake's hometown Toronto where they spent time together in the studio. In June, he teased a Drake collaboration on his Instagram, captioning various posts with emojis of a key and owl, the mascot of Drake's OVO label. He further revealed that "the first single been ready" and confirmed that he was working on a new album. After fans inundated Khaled with questions on the Drake references, he said fans would have to wait a little longer for new music. In early July, Khaled confirmed that Drake was on his new album.
On July 15, a day before the song's release, Khaled announced his 12th studio album would be titled Khaled Khaled. He also announced two Drake collaborations would be released on July 17, "Popstar" and "Greece". DJ Khaled and Drake have collaborated various times, first in 2009 with "Fed Up", and during the 2010s, on "I'm On One", "No New Friends", "For Free" and "To the Max".

Produced by OZ, he previously produced Drake's "Toosie Slide" and several tracks on his Dark Lane Demo Tapes mixtape.

Composition
Producer OZ created the beat on July 23, 2019, and then used a loop by German production duo David x Eli, to take the track to "the next level". The reggae-tinged song contains "moody" production, with a hard, "woozy" beat. Drake's "tight syllables" include lyrics about vacationing in the tropical island Turks and Caicos, which he also referenced on the songs "Omertà" (2019) and "Pain 1993" (2020). He also boasts about his status as the "popstar" of the generation, while name-dropping Scooter Braun, Rihanna, Ariana Grande, Selena Gomez, David Foster, and Justin Bieber.  Complexs Eric Skelton said Drake's style on the song "may have drawn inspiration" from rappers Valee and Baby Keem. Valee's manager Andrew Barber tweeted that Drake replicated Valee's flow on his 2018 track "Womp Womp".

Critical reception
The New York Times Jon Caramanica called the song a "string of ruminative tough talk", and opined "when he raps like this, with a stream of boastfulness, it's often an ego-clearing amuse bouche for a more ambitious release to follow". Rolling Stones Charles Holmes complimented the song's star quality, stating: "It's a blunt object of a song that seems willing to forgo anything resembling subtlety". Billboards Michael Saponara labelled the song "Instagram caption-friendly", and said it oozes with "song of the summer potential".

Music video
With the announcement on the songs, Khaled posted a trailer for the song's video, co-starring Spanish actor Jordi Mollà.

The music video was released on Khaled's YouTube channel on September 3, 2020. The video stars fellow Canadian singer Justin Bieber, replacing Drake and Khaled due to the latter being busy. However, Drake does appear at the beginning of the video, as the video opens up with Drake showing his acting abilities as he receives countless video messages from Khaled, who asks him to appear in the video for the song. Drake, left speechless, then starts to show frustration towards Khaled's constant nagging and hassling. While in his hometown of Canada, Drake then calls Bieber to appear in the video for both him and Khaled. The video also features cameos from Scooter Braun, as well as King Bach, Timothy DeLaGhetto, and Bieber's wife, Hailey Bieber. An edited version removing the intro was also posted on Bieber's YouTube channel.

Chart performance
"Popstar" and "Greece" debuted at numbers three and eight on the Billboard Hot 100, respectively, becoming Drake's record-extending 24th and 25th debuts in the Hot 100's top 10. It also marked his 39th and 40th Hot 100 top ten entries, breaking Madonna's 18-year record.

Awards and nominations

Charts

Weekly charts

Year-end charts

Certifications

References

2020 songs
2020 singles
Canadian Hot 100 number-one singles
DJ Khaled songs
Drake (musician) songs
Songs written by Drake (musician)
Songs written by DJ Khaled
Songs written by Oz (record producer)